Meneñ Stadium is a former stadium on the island Nauru. It is located in the Meneng District. Constructed in 2006, it had a capacity of 3,500 spectators. Unlike other stadiums on the island, Meneñ Stadium had bleachers for spectators.

History 

The area, a large empty sports field, was converted by the Australian Government into a containment area for asylum seekers under the Pacific Solution. At its place is the Nauru Australian Immigration Detention Center (Nauru Regional Processing Centre), which had a small soccer field in the facility.

As part of Nauru's unsuccessful bid to host the 2017 Pacific Mini Games, the Meneng stadium complex was to be upgraded to include tiered seating for 10,000 spectators, reclaiming land that was previously damaged by phosphate mining.

References

External links
Satellite picture of the Menen Stadium
Menen Stadium at Google Maps

Defunct soccer venues in Nauru